The Hermiston-Pendleton Micropolitan Statistical Area, as defined by the United States Census Bureau, is an area consisting of two counties in Oregon anchored by the cities of Hermiston and Pendleton. Although the two communities are generally linked, the Hermiston area has been growing much faster, and is now nearly double the size of the Pendleton area. Portland State University projects that 80% of all growth in the MSA will occur in the immediate Hermiston vicinity between 2016 and 2035.

As of the 2020 U.S. Census, the area had a population of 92,261, up from 87,062 in 2010.  The majority of the population growth over that time period occurred in Umatilla County, with a net increase of 4,186, compared to 1,013 in Morrow County.  The area with the most growth centered around Hermiston, which accounted for 2,609 additional residents, along with the city of Umatilla just five miles to the north, which added 457 residents.  Combined, the Hermiston-Umatilla area accounted for 59% of all population growth in the Hermiston-Pendleton Micropolitan Statistical Area.

Counties
Morrow
Umatilla

Communities

With more than 10,000 inhabitants
Hermiston (Principal city and Largest City)
Pendleton (Principal city and Umatilla County seat)

With 1,000 to 10,000 inhabitants
Athena
Boardman
Heppner (Morrow County seat)
Irrigon
Milton-Freewater
Mission (census-designated place)
Pilot Rock
Stanfield
Umatilla

With fewer than 1,000 inhabitants
Adams
Cayuse (census-designated place)
Echo
Gopher Flats (census-designated place)
Helix
Ione
Kirkpatrick (census-designated place)
Lexington
Riverside (census-designated place)
Tutuilla (census-designated place)
Ukiah
Weston

Unincorporated
Cecil
Clarke
Eightmile
Ella
Gooseberry
Holdman
Lena
Meacham
Morgan
Nolin
Pine City
Rieth
Ruggs
Umapine
Valby

Demographics
As of the census of 2000, there were 81,543 people, 28,971 households, and 20,556 families residing within the μSA. The racial makeup of the μSA was 81.23% White, 0.73% African American, 3.10% Native American, 0.71% Asian, 0.16% Pacific Islander, 11.87% from other races, and 2.20% from two or more races. Hispanic or Latino of any race were 17.23% of the population.

The median income for a household in the μSA was $36,887, and the median income for a family was $41,291. Males had a median income of $31,904 versus $22,606 for females. The per capita income for the μSA was $16,127.

References

 
Morrow County, Oregon
Umatilla County, Oregon